Danielewicz is a Polish-language surname originated in the noble Danielewicz family. It is of patronymic origin, meaning descendants of Daniel or Danilo. Notable people with this surname include:

Ludomir Danilewicz (1905-1960), Polish engineer
, Polish military commander, head of the post-WWII anti-Communist resistance militia, National Military Union (NZW)
 (1927-2013), Polish sculptor 
Wincenty Danilewicz (1787–1878), Napoleonic cavalryman

See also
 Danielewicz families
Danilowicz
Danielewicz
Danilevich
 Ostoja Danielewicz

Polish-language surnames
Patronymic surnames
Surnames from given names

de:Danilewicz